Gresham City Hall station is a MAX light rail station in Gresham, Oregon. It serves the Blue Line and is the 24th stop eastbound on the eastside MAX branch.

Located at the intersection of NW Division Street and NW Eastman Parkway, the station includes a park-and-ride lot.

It is near the Gresham Station retail development, and is next to the new Gresham City Hall, which moved to its current location after MAX opened.

The station was located in TriMet fare zone 4 from its opening in 1986 until September 1988, and in zone 3 from then until September 2012, at which time TriMet discontinued all use of zones in its fare structure.

In 2017, work on an extensive renovation of the then-31-year-old station began on January 23, and the station was scheduled to close completely for six weeks, beginning on February 26, 2017. The station reopened on April 2, 2017.

Bus service 
, this station is served by the following bus lines:
FX2–Division
21–Sandy Blvd/223rd
82–South Gresham

References

External links 
Station information (with westbound ID number) from TriMet
Station information (with eastbound ID number) from TriMet
MAX Light Rail Stations – more general TriMet page

MAX Light Rail stations
Buildings and structures in Gresham, Oregon
MAX Blue Line
1986 establishments in Oregon
Railway stations in the United States opened in 1986
Railway stations in Multnomah County, Oregon